Shebalino is a rural locality (a khutor) and the administrative center of Shebalinovskoye Rural Settlement, Oktyabrsky District, Volgograd Oblast, Russia. The population was 763 as of 2010. There are 12 streets.

Geography 
Shebalino is located in steppe, on Yergeni, on the Myshkova River, 50 km northwest of Oktyabrsky (the district's administrative centre) by road. Chernomorovsky is the nearest rural locality.

References 

Rural localities in Oktyabrsky District, Volgograd Oblast